The Azevka (Äcäw) is a river the Agryzsky District of the Republic of Tatarstan, Russia. It is a left tributary of the Izh in the basin of the Kama.

Geography 

Below falls right tributary Сангас. Behind the village Jamurdino right river flows into the Chushkan. Below on the left bank of the village Urazaevo, the river flows into the Izh. Actually into the Gulf of Kama reservoir, formally,  from the river mouth. After the intended date of filling of the Kama Reservoir, the section of the river below Urazaevo gets into a zone of flooding.

References

Rivers of Tatarstan